

See also

 Alitalia
 Alitalia Express
 Alitalia CityLiner

References

Alitalia
Alitalia